Daniel J. Hall (born 1952) is an American poet.

Life
Hall's first book, Hermit with Landscape, was selected by James Merrill as winner of the 1989 Yale Series of Younger Poets competition.

Hall's second book, Strange Relation, was selected by Mark Doty as winner of the 1995 National Poetry Series. His latest book is Under Sleep.

He was a judge for the James Laughlin awards.

He currently lives in Amherst, Massachusetts and was Writer-in-Residence at Amherst College until 2018. He is on the editorial board of the literary magazine The Common, based at Amherst College.

Awards
 Ingram Merrill Foundation,
 National Endowment for the Arts
 Guggenheim Foundation
 1998 Whiting Award
 1996 National Poetry Series for Under Sleep
 1992-1993 Amy Lowell Traveling Scholar
 1990 Yale Series of Younger Poets Competition, for Hermit with Landscape (Yale, 1990), selected by James Merrill

Works
 Then, University of Chicago
 A Winter Apple, Amherst Magazine, Winter 2007

Books
 Hermit with Landscape, (Yale, 1990)
 Strange Relation, National Poetry Series 1995
 Under Sleep, Phoenix Poets, University of Chicago, 2007, .

Interviews
 J. D. MCCLATCHY The Art of Poetry No. 84, The Paris Review, Issue 163, Fall 2002

Reviews
“Daniel Hall’s work reminds us that a poet’s sharp-sightedness, the whole business of ‘getting things right,’ is a matter of far more than accuracy. It’s a matter of—inescapably—thanksgiving.

Daniel Hall’s poetry also negotiates autobiography and desire, and much of his new collection, Under Sleep, pairs an impulse to elegy (it is dedicated to his late partner) with a love of perceptual activity, that impressionistic seeing and feeling that comes from the conflicting currents of mind and body and is the backbone of so much lyric poetry.

Highly Recommended

References

External links
Profile at The Whiting Foundation

American male poets
1952 births
Living people
Amherst College faculty
Place of birth missing (living people)
American gay writers
Poets from Massachusetts
American LGBT poets
21st-century LGBT people
Gay poets